Budhu Bhagat was an Indian freedom fighter. He had led guerrilla warfare against British. He was leader of Kol rebellion and Larka rebellion in 1831—32 in Chhotanagpur.

Biography
He was born on 17 February 1792 in Silagai village of Chanho block in Ranchi district in British India. He was born into an Oraon farmer family.

Rebellion
Kol rebellion was spread to Ranchi, Hazaribagh, Palamu and Manbhum. In 1831, Budhu Bhagat led Kol rebellion against the British.

In 1832, Buddhu Bhagat led a revolt with the tribals of Chhotanagpur against the oppressive rule of the British and the zamindars. This revolt is known as Lakra rebellion, in which the Oraon, Munda, Bhumij, Ho etc. tribals contributed. The British announced a reward for capturing Budhu Bhagat. British forces arrived to Silagai village on 13 February 1832, and faces stiff resistance from followers of Budhu Bhagat. They attacked British forces with bows, arrows, axes and swords. Budhu Bhagat's sons Haldhar Bhagat and Giridhar Bhagat got killed. Budhu Bhagat was captured and killed by the British.

References 

History of Jharkhand
1790s births
1832 deaths
Indian independence activists